Nattapettai is a census town in Kancheepuram district in the Indian state of Tamil Nadu.

Demographics
 India census, Nattapettai had a population of 10,190. Males constitute 51% of the population and females 49%. Nattapettai has an average literacy rate of 68%, higher than the national average of 59.5%: male literacy is 75%, and female literacy is 60%. In Nattapettai, 12% of the population is under 6 years of age.

References

Cities and towns in Kanchipuram district